Tomé Barbosa de Figueiredo Almeida Cardoso, was an official in the Secretaria de Estado dos Negócios Estrangeiros, and a famous polyglot and etimologist from Portugal; he could speak Greek, Latin, French, Italian, Spanish, Danish, Swedish, German, Turkish, Arabic, and Russian.

He died in Lisbon in 1820 or 1822.

Known works
Périplo, ou circumnavegação de Hannon, trasladada do grego, e annotada, em Jornal de Coimbra, Volume V (1818), pp. 65 e seguintes;
Resumo histórico dos principais portugueses, que no século XVI compuseram em latim, em Jornal de Coimbra, Volume VI (1818), pp. 84–104;

References

Barbosa
1820s deaths
Year of birth missing